Langya may refer to:

Places
 Mount Langya (Anhui) (琅琊山), Anhui, China
 Langya District (琅琊区), Chuzhou, Anhui, China, named after Mount Langya within its jurisdiction
 Langya Temple (琅琊寺), Buddhist temple on Mount Langya, Anhui, China
 Mount Langya (Hebei) (狼牙山), Hebei, China
 Langya, Zhejiang (琅琊镇), town in Zhejiang, China
 Langya Commandery (琅邪郡, 琅琊郡), historical commandery in Shandong, China

Other uses
Nirvana in Fire, 2015 Chinese historical drama TV series
Nirvana in Fire 2, 2017 sequel to Nirvana in Fire
Langya henipavirus (LayV), a species of henipavirus first detected in the Chinese provinces of Shandong and Henan